Macrozamia fawcettii is a species of plant in the family Zamiaceae. It is endemic to New South Wales, Australia.

References

fawcettii
Least concern flora of Australia
Flora of New South Wales
Taxonomy articles created by Polbot